Wendell Gaines (born January 17, 1972) is a former American football defensive lineman for the Arizona Rattlers of the Arena Football League. He was signed by the Arizona Cardinals as an undrafted free agent in 1994. He played college football at Oklahoma State. On March 25, 2002, Gaines re-signed with the Rattlers.

References

External links
Arizona Rattlers bio

1972 births
Living people
American football defensive tackles
American football defensive ends
American football offensive tackles
American football offensive guards
American football tight ends
Oklahoma State Cowboys football players
Arizona Cardinals players
Arizona Rattlers players